The Imam Ali mosque bombing was the detonation of two car bombs outside the Shia Imam Ali Mosque in Najaf on 29 August 2003. The attack killed 95 people crowded around the mosque for Friday prayers, including Ayatollah Mohammed Baqir al-Hakim, spiritual leader of the Supreme Council of the Islamic Revolution in Iraq.

The attack was devastating for the Shia community in Iraq, because such a revered cleric was killed as well as over 90 other people. The bombing was the deadliest attack in Iraq in 2003.

In response to the attack, thousands of Shia mourners marched in the streets of cities and towns across Iraq. The mourners, many of whom blamed Saddam Hussein's loyalists for the attack, held anti-Ba'athist protests.

Saddam himself released a taped audio message in which he denied having any involvement.

Perpetrators 
Al-Qaeda in Iraq (AQI) claimed responsibility for the attack, the New York Sun wrote in 2007.

According to U.S. and Iraqi officials, Abu Musab al-Zarqawi was responsible for Hakim's assassination. They claim that Abu Omar al-Kurdi, a top Zarqawi bombmaker who was captured in January 2005, confessed to carrying out this bombing. They also cite Zarqawi's praising of the assassination in several audiotapes. Some sources even state that Zarqawi's father-in-law was the suicide bomber who detonated the bomb.

In July 2007, the Iraqi Justice Ministry said that an al-Qaeda in Iraq militant had been executed for his role in the bombing. More specifically, Oras Mohammed Abdulaziz, an alleged Al Qaeda militant, was hanged in Baghdad in July 2007 after being sentenced to death in October 2006 for his role in the attack and assassination of al-Hakim.

The US Department of Defense condemned the August 29, 2003 bombing at the Imam Ali Mosque in Al Najaf, Iraq. They offered their condolences to the victims and their families and expressed their commitment to working with the Iraqi people to build a better future.

References

External links
Imam Ali Mosque, Najaf

2003 murders in Iraq
21st-century mass murder in Iraq
Explosions in 2003
Mass murder in 2003
Car and truck bombings in Iraq
Islamic terrorism in Iraq
Islamic terrorist incidents in 2003
Terrorist incidents in Iraq in 2003
Attacks on Shiite mosques
Najaf
Violence against Shia Muslims in Iraq
August 2003 events in Asia
Mosque bombings by Islamists
Building bombings in Iraq
Mosque bombings in Asia